Yanagisawa-ike Dam is an earthfill dam located in Aichi Prefecture in Japan. The dam is used for irrigation. The catchment area of the dam is 0.1 km2. The dam impounds about 1  ha of land when full and can store 30 thousand cubic meters of water. The construction of the dam was started on 1989 and completed in 1991.

References

Dams in Aichi Prefecture
1991 establishments in Japan